{{DISPLAYTITLE:C11H8N2}}
The molecular formula C11H8N2 (molar mass: 168.19 g/mol, exact mass: 168.0687 u) may refer to:

 beta-Carboline (9H-pyrido[3,4-b]indole), or norharmane
 gamma-Carboline